Farb is a surname. Notable people with the surname include:

 Benson Farb (born 1967), American mathematician 
 Carolyn Farb, American fundraiser
 Peter Farb (1929-1980) American anthropologist and author of popular science books

See also
 Farb (reenactment), a derogatory term in the hobby of historical reenactments